The Portland Police Museum is a museum located inside the Department of Justice building in downtown Portland, Oregon, United States. It showcases artifacts related to the city's law enforcement history. Admission is free.

References

External links
 
 Portland Police Museum director resigns amid controversy over storage of old police personnel files by  Maxine Bernstein (June 28, 2014), The Oregonian

Law enforcement in Oregon
Law enforcement museums in the United States
Museums in Portland, Oregon
Southwest Portland, Oregon